Miguel Prats (1871 – death date unknown) was a Cuban baseball rightfielder in the Cuban League and Negro leagues. He played from 1888 to 1908 with several teams, including Progreso, Almendares, Azul, Club Fé, All Cubans, Cuban Stars (West), Habana, and Matanzas.

References

External links

Date of birth missing
Year of death unknown
Place of birth missing
Place of death missing
Club Fé players
All Cubans players
Almendares (baseball) players
Cuban Stars (West) players
Habana players
San Francisco (baseball) players
Matanzas players
Cuban baseball players
Cuban League players